Mixology is an American sitcom that aired during the 2013–14 television season on ABC. The series was co-created by Jon Lucas and Scott Moore, who also serve as co-executive producers with Ryan Seacrest and Nina Wass for Ryan Seacrest Productions and ABC Studios. The series was green-lit by ABC for a series order pick up on May 10, 2013.

On November 19, 2013, it was announced that the series would premiere on February 26, 2014.

On May 8, 2014, ABC canceled Mixology after only one season.

Synopsis
The series takes place all over the course of one night at a Manhattan bar called "Mix", where five women and five men meet up for more than just a casual conversation and a drink. Each episode follows two or three characters as they meet each other for the first time and from there determine the outcome in the finale, which is the end of the night.

Cast and characters

Main
 Adam Campbell as Ron, a failed Internet entrepreneur who is British, ends up alone. He was born in 1983 in Bath, England to parents who were alcoholics. When Ron was old enough, his parents shipped him off to an expensive boarding school. He became a hustler and moved to New York City where he became an internet entrepreneur. He, just like his parents, was the life of the party. He lost millions of dollars in investments when he used the money to buy things for himself, which is illegal.
 Adan Canto as Dominic, a dark and mysterious bartender, ends up alone. Dominic was more into superficial relationships. Ever since he was born, he was the hottest guy. He moved to New York City where he was instantly offered job by a bar he had mistakenly stumbled into. He earns more money than a normal person does, while having sex with random women. For the first time in his life he didn't get what he wanted, a successful music career. His last name is Veracruz.
 Alexis Carra as Jessica, a single mom with two kids; a son and a daughter. She was born in a bar. Ever since she was a kid, Jessica dreamed of being a fashion designer with her best friend Fab. However, she got pregnant with the lead singer in a band. At the beginning of the night, she goes to the bar to meet Ron, who promptly throws up in her purse. She later ends up friends with Bruce. In her online profile, her last name is shown to be Genser.
 Andrew Santino as Bruce, a fast-talking man and one of Tom's best friends. He was born 18 pounds and 9 ounces. He has two older brothers, Kyle and Doug who were athletic and popular but Bruce wasn't. At school, he met Dawn who he fell in love with but Dawn just saw him as a friend. He ends up becoming friends with Jessica. He is the narrator of most of the episodes, the exceptions being "Bruce & Jessica", "Cal & Kacey", "Bruce & Fab" and "Bruce & Maya".
 Blake Lee as Tom, a man recently dumped by his fiancée who hasn’t been out on the town in a decade, ends up with Maya. Tom was born in 1986 in Pawtucket, Rhode Island. Tom's father left him and his mother behind at the age of six; however, he didn't realize this until he was nine years old. Tom met Laura at a college party. After graduating college, they moved into a "very white" part of Brooklyn where they got engaged; however, she dumped him. His last name is Svencen. Tom, just like Maya, hates Hawaiians.
 Craig Frank as Cal, a handsome and confident man who is one of Tom's best friends, ends up with Kacey. He was born in Green Tree, Ohio and was delivered by a Mail man. His parents praised him for everything he did, even for just eating breakfast. This made him very optimistic and he quickly got married three times, to a woman who liked coffee yogurt, his dentist, and a sex addict who he all divorced soon after of them because they turned out to be different people than who Cal thought. His last name is Harris. He is the narrator of the episode "Bruce & Maya", since this one follows both the prior narrators.
 Frankie Shaw as Colleen "Fab", Jessica's gorgeous and stylish best friend from childhood. She is a fashion designer and ends up with a Hawaiian man. She moved to Paris to fulfill her and Jessica's dream since childhood, while Jessica raised two kids. Her whole life has been a struggle, beginning with her 32-hour birth. Her parents fought constantly during her childhood, and her move to Paris turned out to be a disaster. Hours of work amounted to little to nothing, French guys were awful, and she got fired by Nicole Scherzinger as soon as she had gotten her first big break. Her last name is Dawson. She is the only main character who does not appear in every episode, she does not appear in "Tom & Maya".
 Ginger Gonzaga as Maya, an attorney who’s as beautiful as she is brutal, ends up with Tom. Maya was born in 1984 in the front seat of her father's pick-up truck. She had her first beer one minute later. She was the third of six girls. However, her father didn't like girls, so he treated her like a boy, teaching her basketball and fighting for no reason. She earned a basketball scholarship. She dates professional athletes because she considers them "real" men, like Keyshawn Johnson who she dated for a couple of months. She is from Pittsburgh. Because she is constantly assumed to be Hawaiian, she hates them because of their restaurants and flip flops as well as their short alphabet and their sensitivity to Don Ho. She narrates the episodes "Bruce & Jessica", "Cal & Kacey" and "Bruce & Fab".
 Kate Simses as Liv, Maya’s friend who was engaged to Jim who she wants to tell him the engagement is off in favor of Ron. Liv since birth was always a happy child and didn't cry until she was seven. She has an older brother who is the exact opposite of her in every way. She was always into safe guys especially ones who wear helmets. Liv met Jim at the 59 Street Cat Adoption. She just like Jim, likes scrapbooking, cheese, and the entire CBS comedy lineup.

Vanessa Lengies as Kacey, a bubbly cocktail waitress from West Green Tree, Ohio. She starts off the series dating Dominic and later meets Cal. She was an only child delivered by a fireman right before he put out a fire. She met her ex-boyfriend Brad at a cheerleading practice. They moved to New York City and got jobs at Planet Tan in Chelsea. Their dream was to open up a discount tan place for poor people who still wanted to be tan, but Brad turned out to be gay. Later in the night, Kacey was legitimately shocked when Dominic agreed they should take their relationship to the next level, but he didn't know what that meant.

Recurring
Sarah Wright as Laura Johnson, Tom's self-centered ex-fiance. She appears in the episodes "Tom & Maya", "Tom & Maya II" and "Closing Time".
Jonathan Spencer as Carl, a very quiet man who works with Maya and Liv at their law firm. He gives Liv love advice when she gets engaged to Jim. He appears in the episodes "Tom & Maya" and "Liv & Ron".
David Clayton Rogers as Jim, Liv's fiance. He appears in the episodes "Liv & Ron", "Dominic & Kacey" and "Liv & Jim".
Kaitlin Doubleday as Trista, a girl attracted to Bruce's hair. She appears in the episodes "Jessica & Ron" and "Closing Time".

Special guests
Nicole Scherzinger as herself, makes an appearance in the episode "Fab & Jessica & Dominic" when Fab receives an opportunity to dress and make clothes for her.
Alexi Lalas as himself, makes an appearance in the episode "Jessica & Ron" where he is part of the group of the girl Bruce was hitting on. Bruce immediately recognizes him, and idolizes him as the best-known ginger athlete of all time.
Keyshawn Johnson as himself, makes an appearance in the episode "Tom & Maya" where Maya dates him for two months after he becomes a client for her firm.
Sarah Bolger as Janey, Jessica's younger sister, who appears with Jessica in "Tom & Maya" when she is waiting for her date with Ron. Jessica shows her the pictures of Ron she has on her phone. She is credited as main cast in this episode, but does not appear in any of the other episodes, having disappeared for unexplained reasons (the actress left the show), her role as Jessica's companion being taken over by Fab. She is not mentioned in any of the flashbacks of Jessica's life.

Development and production
Mixology, which is the first television project for film writers Lucas and Moore, was the subject of a bidding war among the networks in October 2012, resulting in ABC eventually picking up the project with a put pilot commitment. In February 2013, Seacrest's production company became a joint partner on the project and Wass was added to the production staff.

Casting
Of the 10 cast members who were added during the project, one of the members who was first added when it was announced, Mercedes Masöhn, decided to exit the production in March 2013 to seek other projects. She was replaced by Ginger Gonzaga a week later.

Also, in main publicity shots of the entire cast, Sarah Bolger is seen as an original cast member, but after exiting the production was replaced by Frankie Shaw.

Episodes

Reception

Ratings
The second episode "Liv and Ron", one week later, drew 4.64 million viewers. The least watched episode of the series is the seventh episode "Bruce & Fab", which drew 3.65 million viewers.

Critical reception

Brian Lowry of Variety gave a score of 80%, and wrote, "Maintaining this sort of rat-a-rat patter is no small feat, but the series gets off to such a promising start as to bode well for future installments. Moreover, the shifting pairings from episode to episode create a semi-serialized element that deftly builds off the groundwork laid the previous week, conjuring questions about who’s going to wind up with whom." Karen Valby of Entertainment Weekly gave the series a "B" grade, and wrote, "If you like--or like zoning out to--slick and shiny romantic comedies in the vein of New Year's Eve and Valentine's Day, Mixology is the show for you. But underneath the glossy, Ryan Seacrest-produced banner, this cocktail actually has some genuine sweetness and originality." Diana Werts of Newsday gave the series a grade of "B", and wrote, "Some twisty situations, some unexpected heart, some nuanced acting. Some serious single-camera potential. Could be worth awaiting last call to see who goes where, and why."

David Wiegand of the San Francisco Chronicle gave a positive review, saying, "The show is funny enough, although you might wonder where it would go in a second season, but here's the dirty little secret of Mixology: It's intelligent and poignant as well as being entertaining". Vicki Hyman of the Newark Star-Ledger gave a mixed review, saying, "Only intermittently funny but unceasingly crass." Matt Roush of TV Guide gave a mixed review, saying, "While some of the flirtatious banter in these random odd couplings can be witty and even winsome, after a few rounds (I made it through three episodes), I was ready to close out my tab." David Hinckley of the New York Daily News gave the series 2 out of 5 stars, and wrote, "At the end of the night, Mixology doesn’t have a lot of fizz". Robert Lloyd of the Los Angeles Times gave a mixed review, saying, "There is something mechanical and arbitrary about the plotting, as if a mess of gears that didn't actually go together had been smashed into some semblance of a working order."

Maureen Ryan of The Huffington Post gave a negative review, saying, "In its first few episodes, "Mixology" loudly and repeatedly makes the case that women (who are judged on their adherence to very limited set of rules regarding appearance, dress, behavior, etc.) are objects to be won, that men must employ elaborate stratagems to obtain sex (and only sex) with these female objects, and that even if the facade of "game" drops on occasion, sincerity and kindness are usually things to be mocked." Dan Fienberg of the HitFix gave a negative review, saying, "Nearly every character is introduced in the most repulsive way possible and then the show tries to backtrack, sell the characters out and make it seem like they're all just marshmallows." Tim Goodman of The Hollywood Reporter gave a negative, and wrote, "Mixology is a tone-deaf, poorly executed, badly written series that, in the parlance of the show, kind of rapes comedy." On Rotten Tomatoes, the series has an aggregate score of 33% based on 10 positive and 20 negative critic reviews. The website’s consensus reads: " With an uninteresting story, forgettable cast, and occasionally vulgar humor, Mixology proves a less than intoxicating blend."

References

External links

 

2010s American single-camera sitcoms
2010s American workplace comedy television series
2014 American television series debuts
2014 American television series endings
American Broadcasting Company original programming
English-language television shows
Fictional drinking establishments
Television series by ABC Studios
Television series by Ryan Seacrest Productions
Television shows set in New York City
Works by Jon Lucas and Scott Moore